Theta Ursae Minoris, Latinized from θ Ursae Minoris, is a suspected binary star system that is visible to the naked eye in the northern circumpolar constellation of Ursa Minor. It is roughly 860 light years from Earth with an apparent visual magnitude of 5.0. The system is moving closer to the Sun with a radial velocity of −25 km/s.

This is a probable spectroscopic binary with two roughly equal components.
 The spectrum matches a stellar classification of K5-III CN0.5, which would normally indicate an evolved, orange-hued giant star of type K that has a mild overabundance of cyanogen in the outer atmosphere. The estimated diameter is around 4.8 times that of the Sun, and it is radiating approximately 1,618 times the Sun's luminosity from an expanded photosphere at an effective temperature of 3,962 K.

Photometry from the Hipparcos satellite mission shows that θ Ursae Minoris varies in brightness by a few hundredths of a magnitude.  It is listed as NSV 20342 in the New Catalogue of Suspected Variable Stars.

References

K-type giants
Spectroscopic binaries
Ursae Minoris, Theta
Ursa Minor (constellation)
BD+77 0592
Ursae Minoris, 15
139669
076008
5826
Suspected variables